Belize–United Kingdom relations are foreign relations between Belize and the United Kingdom. The head of state is Charles III, who holds the title King of Belize. Both nations are members of the Commonwealth of Nations and the United Nations.

History

Belize was granted date of independence from the United Kingdom in 1981. Formerly known as British Honduras, the British maintained a garrison in Belize well into the 1990s, until Guatemala, which has always claimed sovereignty of the country, signed a treaty recognizing Belize's independence. The United Kingdom maintains a training centre for the army in Belize.

Queen Elizabeth II visited Belize on two occasions. The first time was in October 1985 and the second time in February 1994. On March 3, 2012, Prince Harry visited Belize on a tour of Commonwealth countries in the region as the Queen's representative in her Diamond Jubilee, making this his first solo royal tour. There he renamed Zennia Boulevard (also known as Cohune Walk Boulevard) in the capital to "Her Majesty Queen Elizabeth II Boulevard", in honour of his grandmother.

Resident diplomatic missions
 Belize has a high commission in London.
 United Kingdom has a high commission in Belmopan.

See also
 Belizean–Guatemalan territorial dispute
 British Army Training and Support Unit Belize

References 

 
Belize
United Kingdom
United Kingdom
United Kingdom and the Commonwealth of Nations
Relations of colonizer and former colony